The 2017 Ivy League men's basketball tournament was a postseason conference tournament for the Ivy League. The tournament was  March 11 and 12, 2017, at the Palestra on the campus of the University of Pennsylvania in Philadelphia.

The tournament marked the first postseason tournament held by the Ivy League in men's basketball however the Ivy League continues to recognize the team or teams with the best record following the regular season to be the Ivy League Champion. In the tournament, league champion Princeton defeated Yale in the championship game to win the tournament. As a result, Princeton received the conference's automatic bid to the NCAA tournament.

Background
The Ivy League was the last NCAA Division I conference to hold a postseason tournament, instead choosing to award its automatic bids to the NCAA men's and women's tournaments to its regular-season champions; in the event that two teams finished tied atop the standings, Ivy League bylaws allowed for a one-game playoff to determine the recipient of the automatic bid, and in exceptionally rare cases, a three-team single-elimination tournament would be scheduled if three teams tied atop the standings (the Ivy League never had more than three regular season co-champions in one season). The Ivy League has historically resisted postseason play in all of its sports.

In March 2016, the League announced that it would institute men's and women's conference tournaments beginning with the 2016–17 season. Both tournaments would initially be held at the same site. The conference also reduced by one the number of regular-season games that its members are allowed to schedule.

Seeds
The top four teams in the Ivy League regular-season standings qualified for the tournament and were seeded according to their records in conference play, resulting in a Shaughnessy playoff.

Schedule

*Game times in Eastern Time. Rankings denote tournament seeding.

Bracket

All-Tournament team
Source
Myles Stephens, Princeton
Steven Cook, Princeton
Sam Downey, Yale
Bryce Aiken, Harvard
Ryan Betley, Penn

See also
 2017 Ivy League women's basketball tournament

References

Ivy League men's basketball tournament
Tournament
Ivy League Men's B
Basketball competitions in Philadelphia
College basketball tournaments in Pennsylvania